Žarko Čabarkapa (born 21 May 1981) is a Montenegrin–Serbian professional basketball executive and former player who is Player personnel director at Fenerbahçe Basketball.

A Yugoslav international, Čabarkapa won the gold medal at the 2002 FIBA World Championship.

Playing career
Čabarkapa played for a Belgrade-based team Beopetrol and Podgorica-based team Budućnost, both of the YUBA League. When playing there, he averaged 8.6 points, 3.8 rebounds, and 1.5 assists per game.

Čabarkapa was drafted by the Phoenix Suns in the 1st round (17th overall) in the 2003 NBA draft. He moved to the United States, but in his rookie season he was injured, and this limited him to only 49 games that season. In 2005, the Suns traded him to the Golden State Warriors in exchange for two second-round draft picks. With the Warriors, he played in 37 games in 2004–05, and 61 games in 2005–06. He had problems with a back injury, and his contract with the Warriors ended in 2007.

Čabarkapa's final NBA game was played on April 15th, 2006 in a 86 - 81 win over the Portland Trail Blazers where he recorded 4 rebounds in 4 minutes of playing time.

After leaving the NBA in 2007, Čabarkapa stopped playing competitive basketball at the age of 26, as he recuperated from injuries. In late November 2008, it was announced that he joined his old club Budućnost, but only in practices, as he looked to get himself back into competitive shape. On January 16, 2009, Čabarkapa signed with Budućnost. Two days later, on January 18, he played his first competitive game in more than two years, appearing for 4 minutes in the Adriatic League clash at home versus KK Cibona. He recorded 2 points, no rebounds, and no assists.

National team career 
Čabarkapa was a member of the FR Yugoslavia U-20 team at the 2000 FIBA Europe Under-20 Championship in Ohrid, Macedonia. Over eight tournament games, he averaged 8.0 points, 3.0 rebounds, and 1.6 assists per game. He was a member of the Yugoslavian university team that won the silver medal at the 1999 Summer Universiade in Palma de Mallorca, Spain.

Čabarkapa was a member of the FR Yugoslavia national team that won the gold medal at the 2002 FIBA World Championship in Indianapolis. Over five tournament games, he averaged 1.6 points and one rebound per game.

Post-playing career 
Čabarkapa was a sports director of the Adriatic Basketball Association from September 2015 to June 2019.

On 2 October 2019, Čabarkapa was hired as the new sports director for Crvena zvezda. He left the Zvezda after the end of the 2019–20 season.

In November 2020, Čabarkapa joined the administration staff of the Turkish club Fenerbahçe Basketball.

See also 
 List of European basketball players in the United States
 List of Montenegrin NBA players
 List of Serbian NBA players

Notes

References

External links

 NBA.com Profile
 Draft Profile

1981 births
Living people
2002 FIBA World Championship players
FIBA World Championship-winning players
Golden State Warriors players
KK Beopetrol/Atlas Beograd players
KK Budućnost players
KK Crvena Zvezda executives
Medalists at the 1999 Summer Universiade
Montenegrin expatriate basketball people in the United States
Montenegrin men's basketball players
National Basketball Association players from Montenegro
National Basketball Association players from Serbia
Phoenix Suns draft picks
Phoenix Suns players
Power forwards (basketball)
Serbian basketball executives and administrators
Serbian expatriate basketball people in Turkey
Serbian expatriate basketball people in the United States
Serbian men's basketball players
Sportspeople from Zrenjanin
Universiade medalists in basketball
Universiade silver medalists for Serbia and Montenegro